Knollwood is an unincorporated community and census-designated place (CDP) in Lake County, Illinois, United States. Per the 2020 census, the population was 2,221. It is located within Shields Township and Libertyville Township. Knollwood shares a ZIP Code with the neighboring village of Lake Bluff, and children attend Lake Bluff schools. The residents of Knollwood were served by the Knollwood Fire Department until October 2018, after the trustees of the Rockland Fire Protection District ended their relationship with the department. Residents now receive fire protection from the Libertyville and Lake Forest fire departments. Police protection is provided by the Lake County Sheriff's Department.

History
The name "Knollwood" first became associated with the area in the early 20th century. The Chicago North Shore and Milwaukee Railroad stop, located at the intersection of Rockland Road and Telegraph Road (now Waukegan Road), was named "Creamer Corners". To the southwest of the station was a  property, consisting of two farms, owned by Mrs. Granger Farwell and Mr. A.C. Accord. This property was known as "Knollwood Farm". In 1923, Knollwood Farm was purchased by a group of wealthy Chicago businessmen (including Samuel Insull, Robert P. Lamont, Nathan William MacChesney and Thomas E. Wilson), who wished to turn the land into a country club. The following year, the Knollwood Country Club was founded, and the purchase was finalized in 1925. The community that sprang up around the club came to be known as Knollwood.

Knollwood's volunteer fire department was founded as the Rockland Fire Department and recognized by the state government in January 1947. Two years later, the department purchased their first fire engine, and a fire department building was constructed in 1951. In 1952, the Rockland Fire Department joined the Illinois Association of Fire Protection Districts and changed its name to the Knollwood Fire Department. The original firehouse was replaced with a modern facility in the same location in 2002, with the new building opening the following year.

Under state statute, Trustees of the Fire Protection District Board were appointed by the Lake County Board. The trustees included Robert Grum, Dan Rogers and Carl Snoblin. Mr. Grum, a former full-time member of the Lake Forest Fire Department who retired as Deputy Chief, and Dan Rogers led the efforts to dissolve the district. Despite a referendum that required trustees to be elected, rather than appointed, and a majority of residents opposing his re-appointment, Rogers was re-appointed to his position, and along with Trustee Grum cast the voted needed to approve an Inter-Governmental Agreement that ended Knollwood FD operations on August 31, 2018.

Several unsuccessful referendums for annexation into the neighboring village of Lake Bluff were held in 1978, 1982, and 1996.

Geography
Knollwood is bordered by the village of Lake Bluff to the north, east, and southeast, by the city of Lake Forest to the south, and by the village of Green Oaks to the west.

Demographics

2020 census

Note: the US Census treats Hispanic/Latino as an ethnic category. This table excludes Latinos from the racial categories and assigns them to a separate category. Hispanics/Latinos can be of any race.

2010 Census
As of the 2010 U.S. Census, the population of Knollwood was 1,747 people, occupying 668 households. The racial makeup was 85.52% White, 4.81% Asian, 4.24% African American, 3.84% identifying as another race, and 1.60% identifying as two races or more. Hispanic or Latino people of any race made up 6.35% of the population. Persons aged 0 to 4 years made up 3.49% of the population, while people aged 5 to 17 years made up 16.89%, 18–64 years at 62.51%, and people aged 65 and up at 17.12%. Men made up 47.45% of the population, while women made up 52.55%.

Transportation

Road
U.S. Route 41 passes through the eastern part of Knollwood, though several sections fall within the boundaries of Lake Bluff. It leads north  to Gurnee and south  to Highland Park. Portions of Illinois Route 43 (Waukegan Road) and Illinois Route 176 (Rockland Road) are also located within Knollwood, although the actual intersection of the two roads lies along the Lake Bluff/Knollwood boundary. Route 43 leads north to Gurnee and south  to Deerfield, while Route 176 leads east  to Lake Bluff and west the same distance to Interstate 94 at Exit 16.

Rail
Knollwood was served by the Mundelein Branch of the Chicago, North Shore and Milwaukee interurban railroad until its abandonment on January 21, 1963. Since then, Knollwood has not been served by passenger rail, though the Lake Bluff Metra Station is located nearby. The Leithton Subdivision of the Canadian National Railway (Formerly the Western Subdivision of the Elgin, Joliet and Eastern Railway) runs through Knollwood, crossing Route 43 at grade. This line was built in the late 1880s as part of the short-lived Waukegan and Southwestern Railway, before it was acquired by the Elgin, Joliet and Eastern in 1891.

Education
Knollwood residents are served by Lake Bluff School District 65, and Lake Forest High School District 115. Public school students receive their elementary education (Kindergarten through Fifth grade) at Lake Bluff Elementary School, middle school education (Sixth grade through Eighth grade) at Lake Bluff Middle School and high school education (Ninth grade through Twelfth grade) at Lake Forest High School. The defunct Lake Bluff West Elementary School (Intended for children living in Knollwood and western Lake Bluff) was also located in Knollwood. The school was constructed in 1962 and opened in 1963. In 1994, District 65 vacated the building, and it currently serves as headquarters for the Shields Township supervisor.

References

External links
Rockland Fire Protection District
Knollwood Neighbors, community organization

Census-designated places in Illinois
Census-designated places in Lake County, Illinois
Unincorporated communities in Illinois
Unincorporated communities in Lake County, Illinois